Bradley Scott Oleson Lashinski (born April 11, 1983) is an American-born naturalized Spanish professional basketball player who currently plays for Amyntas BC of the Greek A2 League. His hometown of North Pole, Alaska, celebrates "Brad Oleson Day", every year, on April 24.

College career
Oleson played college basketball at the University of Alaska Fairbanks. Even though Alaska Fairbanks had a record of 4-23 the season before Oleson arrived at the school, in the three seasons that Oleson played with Fairbanks, the school's record was 64-24. He also set the Great Northwest Athletic Conference record for the most Player of the Week Awards won, with 9.

Professional career
Oleson began his professional career in the year 2005, with the Dodge City Legend of the USBL. He then moved to Rosalía de Castro, where he first played in the Spanish LEB2 League, and then later in the Spanish LEB League. In 2008, he joined the Spanish ACB League club Fuenlabrada. In 2009, he was supposed to play for Real Madrid, but his rights were soon transferred to rivals Caja Laboral, in exchange for Pablo Prigioni and Sergi Vidal.

On 28 January 2013, Oleson signed a two-year deal with the Spanish team FC Barcelona Regal. On March 3, 2015, he signed a two-year extension with the club.

On 13 July 2017, Oleson signed a two-year contract with Spanish club UCAM Murcia.

Spain national team
In October 2009, Oleson acquired Spanish nationality, and was selected to the senior men's Spain national team training camp pre-squad for the 2010 FIBA World Championship.

Career statistics

EuroLeague

|-
| style="text-align:left;"| 2009–10
| style="text-align:left;" rowspan=4| Baskonia
| 12 || 1 || 13.7 || .408 || .400 || .857 || .9 || .4 || .3 || .1 || 5.0 || 2.8
|-
| style="text-align:left;"| 2010–11
| 20 || 11 || 20.9 || .407 || .327 || .800 || 2.1 || 1.1 || .6 || .2 || 6.3 || 4.2
|-
| style="text-align:left;"| 2011–12
| 10 || 6 || 21.9 || .531 || .448 || .917 || 1.4 || 1.7 || .7 || .2 || 7.4 || 7.3
|-
| style="text-align:left;"| 2012–13
| 15 || 13 || 22.9 || .483 || .500 || .786 || 1.3 || 1.5 || .7 || .3 || 8.6 || 7.1
|-
| style="text-align:left;"| 2013–14
| style="text-align:left;" rowspan=4| Barcelona
| 20 || 5 || 20.9 || .470 || .455 || .750 || 1.7 || 1.5 || .5 || .4 || 8.9 || 9.1
|-
| style="text-align:left;"| 2014–15
| 20 || 5 || 19.0 || .419 || .394 || .944 || 1.5 || 2.4 || .7 || .2 || 6.5 || 6.7
|-
| style="text-align:left;"| 2015–16
| 29 || 6 || 14.5 || .316 || .266 || .824 || 1.1 || 1.3 || .2 || .0 || 3.2 || 2.6
|-
| style="text-align:left;"| 2016–17
| 24 || 18 || 21.4 || .682 || .345 || .800 || 1.8 || 2.0 || .6 || .2 || 5.3 || 6.0
|- class="sortbottom"
| style="text-align:left;"| Career
| style="text-align:left;"|
| 126 || 47 || 18.7 || .428 || .391 || .821 || 1.4 || 1.4 || .5 || .2 || 6.3 || 5.5

Awards and accomplishments 
Top of The World Tournament: MVP (2003)
2x Great Northwest Athletic Conference: Steals Leader (2003, 2005)
2x Great Northwest Athletic Conference: Scoring Leader (2004, 2005)
2x Great Northwest Athletic Conference: Player of the Year (2004, 2005)
Great Northwest Athletic Conference: 3 Point Shots Made Leader (2005)
University of Alaska Fairbanks: All-Time Career Scoring Leader
NCAA Division II All-American First Team: (2005)
USBL All-Rookie Team: (2005)
USBL Champion: (2005)
Spanish LEB2 Champion: (2007)
Spanish League Rising Star Award: (2009)
2x Spanish League Champion: (2010, 2014)
Spanish Cup Winner: (2013)
Spanish Supercup Winner: (2015)

References

External links
 Brad Oleson at acb.com 
 Brad Oleson at draftexpress.com
 Brad Oleson at eurobasket.com
 Brad Oleson at euroleague.net

1983 births
Living people
Alaska Nanooks men's basketball players
American expatriate basketball people in Spain
American men's basketball players
Baloncesto Fuenlabrada players
Basketball players from Alaska
FC Barcelona Bàsquet players
Junior college men's basketball players in the United States
Liga ACB players
Naturalised citizens of Spain
Sportspeople from Fairbanks, Alaska
People from North Pole, Alaska
Point guards
Saski Baskonia players
Shooting guards
Spanish men's basketball players